Ordesa y Monte Perdido National Park (Parque nacional de Ordesa y Monte Perdido) is an IUCN Category II National Park situated in the Pyrenees. There has been a National Park in the Ordesa Valley since 1918. Its protected area was enlarged in 1982 to cover the whole region, amounting to 156.08  square kilometres.

It has been included since 1997 by UNESCO in the Biosphere Reserve of Ordesa-Viñamala. In the same year it was included in the cross-border Pyrénées - Mont Perdu World Heritage Site because of its spectacular geologic landforms.

Geology 
The national park was created to protect the high mountain topography of Monte Perdido and the Pyrenees. The region is dominated by limestone, with karst formations such as karren, sinkholes, and caves. The limestone originated from the Cretaceous and Eocene periods. Tectonic uplift has created deep canyons, and, during the Quaternary, repeated glaciations carved cirques and large U-shaped valleys.

Climate 
In general, the climate is typically Pyrenean, although the difference in altitude that goes from 750 meters at the entrance of the Añisclo canyon to 3,355 meters at Monte Perdido and the original orientation of each valley, means that there is an enormous climatic variety that It should be noted: the large variations in humidity and temperature between day and night. Thermal inversions that are reflected in the distribution of vegetation floors. Variable regime of valley and mountain winds.

Flora 
At elevations up to 1,000-1,700 meters, there are extensive forests of beeches (Fagus sylvatica), Abies alba, pines (Pinus sylvestris), oaks (Quercus subpyrenaica), and a lesser extent of birches (Betula pendula), ashes (Fraxinus excelsior), willows  (Salix angustifolia). At higher elevations up to 1,700  meters, the mountain pine (Pinus uncinata) dominates. From 700 to 1,800  meters, bushes of boxwood (Buxus sempervirens) are found. In the high meadows from 1,700 to 3,000 meters, there are numerous endemisms including Borderea pyrenaica, Campanula cochleariifolia, Ramonda myconi, Silene borderei, Androsace cylindrica, Pinguicula longifolia, Petrocoptis crassifolia, etc. The Edelweiss (Leontopodium alpinum), is one of the symbols of the National Park.

Fauna 
The most important species of the Park was the bucardo or Pyrenean ibex, which went extinct in January 2000 in spite of preservation efforts. The Pyrenean chamois is a type of goat antelope. Other species include the alpine marmot, boar, and the Pyrenean desman or water-mole (Galemys pyrenaicus), as well as raptors like the golden eagle, the bearded vulture, the griffon vulture, hawks, and the Eurasian eagle-owl.

Protected status
Many illustrious persons have been fond of the places in this region and have extolled their virtues. Luciano Briet, Soler i Santaló and Lucas Mallada helped promote the reputation of the region and obtain protected status for it.

An area of 21 square kilometres containing the Ordesa Valley was declared a National Park on 16 August 1918 by a Royal Decree. On 13 July 1982, it was enlarged to its current 156.08  square kilometres, and its official name was changed to Parque nacional de Ordesa y Monte Perdido.

Gallery

Bibliography

References

External links 

Official website, from the Spanish Ministry of Environment
Information on the glaciers of the Ordesa y Monte Perdido National Park
Birding itinerary and sounds of Ordesa National Park

National parks of Spain
Protected areas of the Pyrenees
Protected areas of Aragon
Canyons and gorges of Spain
Protected areas established in 1918
Biosphere reserves of Spain
Landforms of Aragon
1918 establishments in Spain
Pyrenees conifer and mixed forests